Mitchell James Duggan (born 20 March 1997) is a  professional footballer who currently plays as a defensive midfielder for Warrington Town.

References

1997 births
Living people
Association football forwards
English footballers
Association football midfielders
Tranmere Rovers F.C. players
Warrington Town F.C. players
Marine F.C. players
Trafford F.C. players
Flint Town United F.C. players
Southport F.C. players
English Football League players
National League (English football) players
Northern Premier League players
Cymru Premier players